Patrick Thomas Brady (September 7, 1926 – July 14, 2009) was an American football player who was a quarterback and punter for the University of Nevada, Reno and later for the Pittsburgh Steelers of the National Football League.

Early years 
Brady attended Nevada-Reno from 1948 until 1951, first as a quarterback and then as a punter.  On October 28, 1950 against Loyola Marymount, Brady had a punt of 99 yards, the longest possible under the rules, a record that cannot be broken and has never been tied.  Brady completed his collegiate career at and graduated from Bradley University in 1951, after Nevada cancelled its 1951 season due to budget shortfalls.

Career 
After spending the 1951 season in the Canadian Football League, Brady played for the Steelers during the 1952, 1953, and 1954 seasons, leading the league in punting in 1953 and 1954 and averaging 44.5 yards for his three years.  A torn Achilles tendon during the 1955 pre-season ended his career.

After football, Brady moved back to Reno and worked in the printing industry.  In 1971, he was appointed the official State Printer by Governor Mike O'Callaghan.  Brady was a part-owner of Reno's Bonanza Casino for many years, and was also on the Nevada Boxing Commission.

Recognition 
Brady was inducted into the Bradley Hall of Fame on February 23, 1955 and later the Nevada Hall of Fame in 1979.  He was also named to the Steelers 50th Anniversary team in 1982.

Death 
Brady died on July 14, 2009 in Reno, Nevada after a long battle with lymphoma.

References

1926 births
2009 deaths
Players of American football from Seattle
Players of Canadian football from Seattle
American players of Canadian football
American football quarterbacks
American football punters
Nevada Wolf Pack football players
Bradley Braves football players
Hamilton Tiger-Cats players
Pittsburgh Steelers players
Deaths from lymphoma
Deaths from cancer in Nevada